The Philippine highway network is a network of national roads owned and maintained by the Department of Public Works and Highways (DPWH) and organized into three classifications according to their function or purpose: national primary, secondary, and tertiary roads. The national roads connecting major cities are numbered from N1 to N83. They are mostly single and dual carriageways linking two or more cities.

According to a 2011 report from the Asian Development Bank, the extent of the road network in the Philippines is comparable with or better than many neighboring developing countries in Southeast Asia. However, in terms of the quality of the road system, i.e., the percentage of paved roads and the percentage of those in good or fair condition, the country lagged behind its neighbors .

Classification
The national roads in the Philippines are classified into three types by the Department of Public Works and Highways under the Philippine Highway Act of 1953 (Republic Act No. 917) and the series of memorandums issued by the department between 2009 and 2014.

National Primary
The national primary roads are roads which form parts of the main trunkline system and directly connect three or more major cities and metropolitan areas with a population of at least 100,000. They are further classified into the north–south backbone, east–west lateral, and other roads of strategic importance. The north–south backbone refers to the main trunkline, the Pan-Philippine Highway (N1, also designated as Asian Highway 26), which runs from Laoag in the northernmost parts of Luzon to Zamboanga City in western Mindanao, interconnecting the country's major islands. The east–west lateral roads are roads that traverse this backbone and runs east–west across the different islands. Other roads of strategic importance provide access to other areas vital for regional development and infrastructure.

National Secondary
The national secondary roads are roads that complement the primary roads and provide access to other major population centers. They directly link smaller cities and provincial capitals, airports, seaports, and tourist centers to the primary roads.

National Tertiary
The third classification was introduced in 2014 known as national tertiary roads. They include other existing roads administered by the DPWH which perform a local function.

Numbering system 
The national roads in the Philippines are labelled with pentagonal black-on-white highway shields. Under the route numbering system of the Department of Public Works and Highways, highways numbered from N1 to N11 are the main routes or priority corridors, such as the national primary roads that connect three or more cities. The other primary roads that link two cities and municipalities with 100,000 people or less are numbered N51 to N83.

The national secondary roads are assigned with three-digit numbers where the first digit usually corresponds to the number of the primary road it links to. In the case where the secondary road connects to more than one primary road, its first digit is the lower numbered primary route.

In Metro Manila, an older route numbering system is also being implemented alongside the National Route Numbering System of the Department of Public Works and Highways. Created in 1945, Manila's arterial road network consists of 10 radial roads which serve the purpose of conveying traffic in and out of the city of Manila and are numbered in a counter-clockwise pattern, and 6 circumferential roads that serve as the beltways of the city.

Numbered routes 
The Philippine highway network consists of the following routes, as of 2021:

Primary roads 

Notes

Secondary roads

Unnumbered routes

Secondary roads

See also

 Asian highway network
 Philippine expressway network
 Philippine Nautical Highway System
 Manila's arterial road network
 Transportation in the Philippines
 List of bridges in the Philippines

References

Roads in the Philippines
Transportation in the Philippines